E. B. Hawkins House, also known as the Hawkins-Ballard House, is a historic mansion located at Fayetteville, Fayette County, West Virginia. It was built in 1905–1906, and is a  clapboard and shingle-sided dwelling in a modified Colonial Revival style.  It features gambrel roofs and rambling porches.  Also on the property are a guest house (c. 1918), garage (c. 1910), barn (c. 1905–1906), and frame cottage (c. 1918). It is now known as the Historic White Horse Bed and Breakfast.

It was listed on the National Register of Historic Places in 1990.

References

External links
Historic White Horse Bed and Breakfast website

Houses on the National Register of Historic Places in West Virginia
Colonial Revival architecture in West Virginia
Houses completed in 1906
Houses in Fayette County, West Virginia
National Register of Historic Places in Fayette County, West Virginia
Bed and breakfasts in West Virginia
Historic districts in Fayette County, West Virginia
Fayetteville, West Virginia
1906 establishments in West Virginia